Stephen Scullion (born 9 November 1988) is an Irish middle-distance and long-distance runner.

Early life
Scullion was born in Belfast and attended Wellington College.

Athletic career

Scullion was selected for Northern Ireland at the 2010 Commonwealth Games in the 1500m and 5000m, but missed out due to illness. He competed in the 3000 metres at the 2013 European Athletics Indoor Championships and in the 10000 m at the 2018 European Athletics Championships.

At the 2019 Houston Marathon he finished tenth in a personal best, despite taking a wrong turn and being corrected by a member of the public. He qualified for the 2019 World Championships and for the 2020 Summer Olympics. Scullion finished second in the 2019 Dublin Marathon and eleventh in the 2020 London Marathon.

He competed in the men's marathon at the 2020 Summer Olympics held in Tokyo, Japan.

He represented Northern Ireland at the 2022 Commonwealth Games where he finished 10th in the men's marathon event.

References

External links
 
 
 
 
 
 
 

1988 births
Living people
Athletes from the Republic of Ireland
Irish male long-distance runners
Irish male marathon runners
Sportspeople from Belfast
People educated at Wellington College Belfast
Athletes (track and field) at the 2010 Commonwealth Games
Commonwealth Games competitors for Northern Ireland
Olympic male marathon runners
Athletes (track and field) at the 2020 Summer Olympics
Olympic athletes of Ireland
20th-century Irish people
21st-century Irish people
Athletes (track and field) at the 2022 Commonwealth Games